Stenotus acaulis is a species of flowering plant in the family Asteraceae known by the common name stemless mock goldenweed.

It is native to the western United States, where it grows in rocky soils in sagebrush plateau and mountain habitats.

Description
Stenotus acaulis is a perennial herb usually forming a compact tuft or mat of hairless to hairy and sometimes glandular herbage. The linear to widely lance-shaped leaves are up to 8 or 10 centimeters long with rigid, hair-lined edges.

The inflorescence is a solitary flower head or small cluster of a few heads. The flower head contains yellow disc florets and several yellow ray florets each about a centimeter long.

References

External links
Database:  Stenotus acaulis (Stemless mock goldenweed)
 Jepson Manual eFlora (TJM2) treatment of  Stenotus acaulis
 USDA Plants Profile for Stenotus acaulis (stemless mock goldenweed)
Flora of North America: Stenotus acaulis
UC CalPhotos gallery of Stenotus acaulis

Astereae
Flora of the Western United States
Flora of California
Flora of the Great Basin
Flora of the Sierra Nevada (United States)
Taxa named by Thomas Nuttall
Flora without expected TNC conservation status